Preston is a village and civil parish in the East Riding of Yorkshire, England, in an area known as Holderness.

The civil parish is formed by the village of Preston and the hamlet of Salt End.

According to the 2011 UK census, Preston parish had a population of 3,258, an increase on the 2001 UK census figure of 3,100.

The parish church of All Saints is a Grade I listed building.

There is both a primary school (Preston Primary School) and a secondary school, which achieved Technology College status in 1997, and has a sixth form facility joined onto the school, in Preston. South Holderness Technology College converted to an academy known as Holderness Academy and serves the surrounding villages of Paull, Hedon, Bilton, Skirlaugh, Keyingham, Thorngumbald, Aldbrough, West Newton, Burton Constable, Sproatley and others.

Preston has two pubs, a pizza takeaway, a Chinese takeaway and a garden centre, with a farm shop. There is also a butcher's shop on the main street, along with the Post Office, the Post Office has closed but the shop remains. It also has a hairdressers and a traditional barbers shop.

Recently 'Preston (South)' was marked clearly by the Council, however the two are not geographically all that close, and still stand as two separate areas separated in places by Hedon.

In February 2023, a £9.6 million crematorium opened off Sproatley Road.

References

External links

Villages in the East Riding of Yorkshire
Holderness
Civil parishes in the East Riding of Yorkshire